The 2017 Georgia State Panthers beach volleyball represented Georgia State University during the college beach volleyball season of 2017. The team's head coach was Beth Van Fleet in her fourth season at GSU. The Panthers played their home games at the GSU Beach Volleyball Complex and competed in the  Division I Coastal Collegiate Sports Association. The 2016 season was the second as an official NCAA sport, and the first that the Panthers played in the CCSA, finishing in second place. The Panthers were ranked in the official top 10 during the entire season, earning a spot as the 7th seed in the NCAA Tournament.

2017 Roster

Schedule

|- bgcolor="#ccffcc"
| March 4 || UNC Wilmington || 8 || St. Augustine, FL || 10:30 AM || W 4-1 || 1-0 (1-0)
|- bgcolor="#ccffcc"
| March 4 || Charleston || 8 || St. Augustine, FL || 1:30 PM || W 5-0 || 2-0 (2-0)
|- bgcolor="#ccffcc"
| March 5 || North Florida || 8 || St. Augustine, FL || 9:30 AM || W 5-0 || 3-0 (2-0)
|- bgcolor="#ccffcc"
| March 5 || Spring Hill || 8 || St. Augustine, FL || 12:30 PM || W 5-0 || 4-0 (2-0)
|- bgcolor="#ccffcc"
| March 7 || Austin Peay || 7 || GSU Beach Volleyball Complex || 9:00 AM || W 5-0 || 5-0 (2-0)
|- bgcolor="#ccffcc"
| March 7 || Mercer || 7 || GSU Beach Volleyball Complex || 5:00 PM || W 3-2 || 6-0 (2-0)
|- align="center" bgcolor="#ffccc"
| March 11 || Cal Poly || 7 || Manhattan Beach, CA || 2:30 PM || L 4-1 || 1-6 (2-0)
|- align="center" bgcolor="#ffccc"
| March 11 || #6 Long Beach State || 7 || Manhattan Beach, CA || 5:30 PM || L 0-5 || 6-2 (2-0)
|- align="center" bgcolor="#ffccc"
| March 12 || #4 UCLA || 7 || Manhattan Beach, CA || 2:00 PM || L 0-5 || 6-3 (2-0)
|- align="center" bgcolor="#ffccc"
| March 12 || #3 Pepperdine || 7 || Manhattan Beach, CA || 7:00 PM || L 1-4 || 6-4 (2-0)
|- bgcolor="#ccffcc"
| March 17 || Jacksonville State || 8 || Deland, FL || 9:00 AM || W 5-0 || 7-4 (2-0)
|- bgcolor="#ccffcc"
| March 17 ||  New Mexico || 8 || Deland, FL || 12:00 PM || W 3-2 || 8-4 (2-0)
|- bgcolor="#ccffcc"
| March 17 || Morehead State || 8 || Deland, FL || 2:00 PM || W 5-0 || 9-4 (2-0)
|- bgcolor="#ccffcc"
| March 18 || Stetson || 8 || Deland, FL || 10:00 AM || W 3-2 || 10-4 (2-0)
|- align="center" bgcolor="#ffccc"
| March 18 || Florida Atlantic || 8 || Deland, FL || 1:00 PM || L 2-3 || 10-5 (2-1)
|- align="center" bgcolor="#ffccc"
| March 25 || Stetson || 9 || Columbia, SC || 1:00 PM || 3-2 || 10-6 (2-1)
|- align="center" bgcolor="#ffccc"
| March 25 || Florida State || 9 || Columbia, SC || 9:00 AM || 3-2 || 10-7 (2-2)
|- align="center" bgcolor="#ffccc"
| March 26 || USC || 9 || Columbia, SC || 3:00 PM || 5-0 || 10-8 (2-2)
|- bgcolor="#ccffcc"
| March 26 || South Carolina || 9 || Columbia, SC || 11:00 AM || 3-2 || 11-8 (3-2)
|- align="center" bgcolor="#ffccc"
| April 1 || LSU || 10 || GSU Beach Volleyball Complex || 12:30 PM || 3-2 || 11-9 (3-3)
|- bgcolor="#ccffcc"
| April 1 || Lincoln Memorial || 10 || GSU Beach Volleyball Complex || 6:30 PM || 5-0 || 12-9 (3-3)
|- bgcolor="#ccffcc"
| April 2 || UAB || 10 || GSU Beach Volleyball Complex || 2:00 PM || 4-1 || 13-9 (4-3)
|- bgcolor="#ccffcc"
| April 2 || Jacksonville State || 10 || GSU Beach Volleyball Complex || 6:00 PM || 5-0 || 14-9 (4-3)
|- align="center" bgcolor="#ffccc"
| April 7 || TCU || 10 || Tallahassee, FL || 8:30 AM || 3-2 || 14-10 (4-3)
|- bgcolor="#ccffcc"
| April 7 || Florida Atlantic || 10 || Tallahassee, FL || 11:30 AM || 3-2 || 15-10 (5-3)
|- align="center" bgcolor="#ffccc"
| April 8 || South Carolina || 10 || Tallahassee, FL || 8:30 PM || 4-1 || 15-11 (5-4)
|- bgcolor="#ccffcc"
| April 8 || Florida International || 10 || Tallahassee, FL || 2:30 PM || 3-2 || 16-11 (6-4)
|- bgcolor="#ccffcc"
| April 14 || ULM || 10 || Baton Rouge, LA || 3:00 PM || 3-2 || 17-11 (6-4)
|- bgcolor="#ccffcc"
| April 14 || Spring Hill || 10 || Baton Rouge, LA || 6:00 PM || 4-1 || 18-11 (6-4)
|- bgcolor="#ccffcc"
| April 15 || TAMU Kingsville || 10 || Baton Rouge, LA || 10:00 AM || 5-0 || 19-11 (6-4)
|- align="center" bgcolor="#ffccc"
| April 15 || LSU || 10 || Baton Rouge, LA || 3:00 PM || 3-2 || 19-12 (6-5)
|- bgcolor="#ccffcc"
| April 21 || (7) Charleston (CCSA Championship Group State) || (9) #3 Seed || Emerson, GA || 10:30 AM || 5-0 || 20-11 (1-0)
|- align="center" bgcolor="#ffccc"
| April 21 || (6) Florida Atlantic (CCSA Championship Group Stage) || (9) #3 Seed || Emerson, GA || 3:00 PM || 2-3 || 20-12 (1-1)
|- align="center" bgcolor="#ffccc"
| April 22 || (2) LSU (CCSA Championship Group Stage) || (9) #3 Seed || Emerson, GA || 12:00 PM || 2-3 || 20-13 (1-2)
|- bgcolor="#ccffcc"
| April 22 || (10) UAB (CCSA Championship Group Stage) || (9) #3 Seed || Emerson, GA || 3:00 PM || 21-13 || 21-13 (2-2)
|-

 Conference Games in bold

References

External links
 Georgia State University Official website
 Georgia State Panthers Official Athletics website

2017
Georgia State Panthers women's beach volleyball